Kristina Triska (born 6 March 1980 in Älmhult) is a retired Swedish tennis player.

Triska won two singles and three doubles titles on the ITF Circuit in her career. On 15 September 1997, she reached her best singles ranking of world No. 147. On 21 September 1998, she peaked at No. 166 in the doubles rankings.

In 1998, Triska played eight rubbers for the Sweden Fed Cup team.

ITF Circuit finals

Singles: 8 (2–6)

Doubles: 7 (3–4)

References

 
 
 

1980 births
Living people
People from Älmhult Municipality
Swedish female tennis players
Sportspeople from Kronoberg County
20th-century Swedish women
21st-century Swedish women